Vivianne L.W.A. Heijnen (born 8 October 1982) is a Dutch politician of the Christian Democratic Appeal (CDA) party. She has been serving as the Minister for the Environment as part of the fourth Rutte cabinet since January 2022. Heijnen was previously head of the Brussels campus of her alma mater Maastricht University, and she was active in local politics in Maastricht as municipal councilor (2010–18) and alderwoman (2018–22).

Early life and career 
Heijnen was born and raised in Spaubeek, a village in Limburg, with her brother. Her father, Thijs, owned a business, while her mother, Gabriëlle, worked as a logopedist. Her grandfather, Hein Corten, had served as the mayor of Ulestraten, Schimmert, and Susteren as a member of the VVD. Heijnen attended the Geleen secondary school Graaf Huyn College and started studying law at Maastricht University in 2000. She left two years later to study European studies at the same university and received her Master of Arts degree in European public affairs in 2006. Heijnen subsequently worked as a freelance lobbyist in Brussels for clients such as pension fund ABP. She took a job as tutor at Maastricht University in 2008 and became head of its Brussels campus the following year. The campus, which is situated in a single building and started out with a €250,000 annual budget, opened in 2010 and moved to a different location in April 2018, at a time when its budget had been doubled. She left her job upon her appointment as alderwoman two months later.

Maastricht politics 
Heijnen participated in the March 2010 municipal election in Maastricht, being placed fourth on the CDA's party list. She had decided to become politically involved as a result of her role as a lobbyist. Her party won seven seats in the council, but Heijnen was not elected as candidates lower on the list had cleared the preference vote threshold. She was appointed to the council on 6 April after two CDA councilors stepped down to become aldermen in the new municipal executive. In October 2010, the CDA's council group leader, Peter Geelen, resigned following the falling apart of the government coalition, which later resulted in the CDA becoming an opposition party in Maastricht for the first time since World War II. Heijnen was chosen to succeed him in late November, and she said that safety would be one of the party's priorities. The Maastricht CDA decided the following year to call for the closing of all coffeeshops in the city because of the nuisances they were causing. Heijnen was re-elected to the council in March 2014 as lead candidate, while her party lost two seats. She headed a confidential committee in 2015 to find a new mayor for Maastricht, which recommended Annemarie Penn-te Strake. Heijnen also tried without success to bring the headquarters of the European Medicines Agency from London to South Limburg, when it had to be relocated as a result of Brexit.

She ran for member of parliament in the 2017 general election as the CDA's 26th candidate. She received 15,821 preference votes, 90% of which were cast in her home province of Limburg, but she was not elected due to her party winning nineteen seats. Locally, Heijnen was again her party's lead candidate in the March 2018 municipal elections. The CDA won a plurality in the council, and she kept her seat. She left the council on 18 June 2018 to become alderwoman and deputy mayor in the new municipal executive. Her responsibilities included the economy, the job market, regionalization, housing, well-being, permits, social innovation, and smart city. To increase citizen participation in local politics, Heijnen organized a forum, during which inhabitants could determine on which projects €300,000 of the municipal budget would be spent, following a similar idea in Antwerp. Its first round was held in 2021 after a number of postponements due to the COVID-19 pandemic. In the run up to a 2020 CDA leadership election, she endorsed Pieter Omtzigt, who would eventually lose. She stepped down as alderwoman when she was appointed Minister for the Environment in January 2022. She also withdrew herself as lead candidate in the 2022 municipal elections.

Minister for the Environment 
Heijnen became a member of the new fourth Rutte cabinet and was sworn in on 10 January 2022 at Noordeinde Palace by King Willem-Alexander. She serves as Secretary for Infrastructure and Water Management, succeeding Steven van Weyenberg, but internationally she wears the title of Minister for the Environment. Her portfolio includes environment (excluding climate), soil, public transport, railways, international public transport, cycling policy, sustainable transport, the KNMI, the ANVS, and the PBL. The cabinet extended financial aid to public transport due to the COVID-19 pandemic from September to December 2022. Numerous local politicians warned that ending the aid afterwards would threaten a downgrade of the public transport network due to the sustained effects of the pandemic on ridership, and Heijnen subsequently offered another €150 million in conditional aid for 2023 – significantly less than the €500 million public transport providers had asked for. Heijnen was also responsible for appropriating €40 million for subsidies for hydrogen and electric trucks. The initial €13.5 million in subsidies allocated for 2022 was raised by €11.5 million after applications for thrice the former amount were filed on the first day it was possible. In March 2022, Heijnen announced a ban on disposable plastic cups and meal packaging in the office, on festivals, and in hotels and restaurants starting in 2024 in line with the European Union's Single-Use Plastics Directive to decrease waste.

Notes

References 

1982 births
21st-century Dutch politicians
21st-century Dutch women politicians
Aldermen in Limburg (Netherlands)
Christian Democratic Appeal politicians
Dutch academic administrators
Living people
Maastricht University alumni
Municipal councillors of Maastricht
People from Beek
Women academic administrators
Dutch lobbyists
State Secretaries for Infrastructure of the Netherlands